Christer Holloman is the CEO and founder of Divido, an instalment payments company. Christer was formerly a technology feature writer for Sky News and author of The Social Media MBA book. He helped launch Expedia founder Rich Barton’s latest start-up Glassdoor.com in Europe and prior to that was Head of Digital Product Development at The Times and The Sunday Times.

Education and awards 

Holloman is an MBA graduate at Saïd Business School, University of Oxford. He earned his BS in Business & Economics at the University of Umeå, Sweden.

He won The Telegraph's Digital Innovation Award 2011. He was identified as one of London’s 1,000 Most Influential Individuals and ranked as Top 25 Within New Media by The Evening Standard in 2009. Holloman was shortlisted as one of the UK's most important figures within the UK Digital industry in a competition held by The Hospital Club and The Independent in 2010.

Books, commentary and speaking 

His book, The Social Media MBA in Practice, was released August 2013 in three languages by Wiley.

He also wrote a series of four guidebooks titled First Time Entrepreneur Series that addresses the life cycle of a new business.

He is a professional business speaker, and an expert commentator on TV.

References

External links 
 Divido Website
 First Tuesday UK
 Sky News Tech Talk
 Holloman's Personal Website
 Holloman's Twitter

Business speakers
Living people
British businesspeople
Year of birth missing (living people)
Alumni of Saïd Business School